Sarychev or Sarichef may refer to
Sarychev (surname)
Sarychev Peak, a stratovolcano in the Kuril Islands, Russia
Sarichef Island in the Chukchi Sea
Cape Sarichef Airport on Unimak Island in the Aleutian Islands
Cape Sarichef Light, a lighthouse on Unimak Island